Abbas I (27 January 157119 January 1629), commonly known as Abbas the Great, was the 5th Safavid Shah (king) of Iran, and is generally considered one of the greatest rulers of Iranian history and the Safavid dynasty. He was the third son of Shah Mohammad Khodabanda.

Although Abbas would preside over the apex of Safavid Iran's military, political and economic power, he came to the throne during a troubled time for the country. Under the ineffective rule of his father, the country was riven with discord between the different factions of the Qizilbash army, who killed Abbas' mother and elder brother. Meanwhile, Iran's enemies, the Ottoman Empire (its archrival) and the Uzbeks, exploited this political chaos to seize territory for themselves. In 1588, one of the Qizilbash leaders, Murshid Qoli Khan, overthrew Shah Mohammed in a coup and placed the 16-year-old Abbas on the throne. However, Abbas soon seized power for himself.

Under his leadership, Iran developed the ghilman system where thousands of Circassian, Georgian, and Armenian slave-soldiers joined the civil administration and the military. With the help of these newly created layers in Iranian society (initiated by his predecessors but significantly expanded during his rule), Abbas managed to eclipse the power of the Qizilbash in the civil administration, the royal house, and the military. These actions, as well as his reforms of the Iranian army, enabled him to fight the Ottomans and Uzbeks and reconquer Iran's lost provinces, including Kakheti whose people he subjected to widescale massacres and deportations. By the end of the 1603–1618 Ottoman War, Abbas had regained possession over Transcaucasia and Dagestan, as well as swaths of Eastern Anatolia and Mesopotamia. He also took back land from the Portuguese and the Mughals and expanded Iranian rule and influence in the North Caucasus, beyond the traditional territories of Dagestan.

Abbas was a great builder and moved his kingdom's capital from Qazvin to Isfahan, making the city the pinnacle of Safavid architecture. In his later years, following a court intrigue involving several leading Circassians, Abbas became suspicious of his own sons and had them killed or blinded.

Early life 
Born in 27 January 1571 in Herat, Abbas was the third son of Mohammad Khodabanda and his wife, Khayr al-Nisa Begum. His father was the firstborn son of Tahmasp I, the second Shah of Safavid Iran. He chose the name Abbas for the infant. Abbas' father, Mohammad Khodabanda, was the governor of Herat, the capital city of the major province of Khorasan. Mohammad Khodanbanda was disqualified from succeeding his father because an eye disease had left him almost completely blind. The Safavid court chronicler, Iskandar Beg Monshi, describes Mohammad Khodabanda as ‘a pious, ascetic and gentle soul’. Abbas' mother, Khayr al-Nisa Begum, was the daughter of Mir Abdollah II, a local ruler in the province of Mazandaran from the Mar'ashi dynasty who claimed descant from the fourth Shi'ia imam, Ali ibn Husayn Zayn al-Abidin. She and Mohammad Khodabanda had already two children before Abbas— Hassan and Hamza, and she birthed two more sons later— Abu Taleb and Tahmasp.

When Abbas was barely eighteen months old, he was separated from his family, namely, his father and his mother, who were transferred by Tahmasp to govern the city of Shiraz. The nominal governorship of Herat was handed over to Abbas. At first, Tahmasp intended to make Hamza the governor of Herat, but Khayr al-Nisa Begum was unwilling to be separated from Hamza, who was her favourite son. So she persuaded the king to appoint Abbas instead. The fact that Abbas was still a baby was not considered an obstacle, as Tahmasp himself had been appointed titular governor of Khorasan at the age of two.

Shah Qoli Sultan Ustajlu, an amir from one of the Qizilbash tribes called the Ustajlu tribe, was appointed as the actual governor and as Abbas’s lala (guardian). Abbas’s Qizilbash guardians and their wives became substitute parents for him. He never saw his mother again and only saw his father fifteen years later. Abbas learnt the necessary skills of a soldier from his Qizilbash guardians. He played polo and went frequently to hunt. Like most of the Iranian kings, he developed a passion for hunting, which was regarded as a form of military training. Abbas was educated alongside  household ‘slaves’, or ghulams, who would have become his childhood companions. Some or perhaps most of them are likely to have been Georgians, Armenians or Circassians.

In 1576, Tahmasp I died without a designed heir, leading the realm to descend into civil war. At first, the former shah's favourite son, Haydar Mirza, proclaimed himself king with the support of the Ustajlu tribe and the powerful court Georgians. However, he was soon overthrown by the qurchis (the royal bodyguards). After his death, with the support of the majority of the Qizilbash tribes and the endorsement of Tahmasp's influential daughter, Pari Khan Khanum, Ismail Mirza, who was imprisoned by his father for twenty years, was crowned king as Ismail II. The new king's reign turned out to be short and murderous. The long years of imprisonment had left him suffering from paranoia, with the result that he saw enemies everywhere who had to be eliminated. First and foremost, he began mass murdering the members of Ustajlu tribe regardless of whether or not they had supported Haydar Mirza. He also executed people whose only crime was having a position during Tahmasp's reign. The young Abbas was directly affected by his uncle's purge when a group of horsemen rushed into his guardian's house, Shah Qoli Sultan, and killed him.

Ismail then turned to his family. He ordered the execution of many of his half-brothers, cousins and nephews. He spared Mohammad Khodabandae, possibly because they were full-brothers and perhaps because Mohammad Khodabanda was already blind and disqualified as a possible claimant to the throne. In November 1577, however, Ismail dispatched Ali-Qoli Khan from the Shamlu tribe to Herat to kill the young Abbas. Ali-Qoli delayed Abbas' execution, giving as a reason that it would be "inappropriate" to execute an "innocent" descendant of a seyed on holy days (Qadr Night and Eid al-Fitr). This lingering saved Abbas' life, for in 24 November, Ismail II died from consuming poisoned opium, and Ali-Qoli Khan assumed the governorship of Herat and the role of the new guardian for Abbas.

On 11 or 13 February 1577, Mohammad Khodabanda was chosen by the Qizilbash as the new shah. The new shah appeared weak, indifferent, and incompetent. In these circumstances power soon passed into other hands. Abbas' mother, Khayr al-Nisa Begum, was a strong-willed woman. She took complete charge of the administration and made all the decisions, even in military matters. The Qizilbash were not happy to see her taking power. The divisions in the Safavid court encouraged rebellions in various parts of the country and the old Qizilbash rivalries rose again, with the Ustajlu and Shamlu tribes immediately confronting each other. Mohammad Khodabanda and the queen asked Ali-Qoli Khan to bring Abbas to Qazvin, in fear that Ali-Qoli Khan was conspiring to enthrone Abbas, but the Qizilbash amirs of Khorasan argued that with the threat of the Uzbeks of Bukhara raiding along Herat, the presence of a prince in the city was necessary.

The weak state of the realm led to the Ottoman Empire to declare war against Iran in 1578. The Safavid armies suffered several defeats before Khayr al-Nisa Begum sought a counteroffensive. Together with her son, Hamza Mirza and the grand vizier, Mirza Salman Jaberi, she led an army north to confront the Ottoman and Tatar forces in Shirvan. But her attempt to dictate the campaign strategy angered the Qizilbash amirs. Eventually, on 26 July 1579, the Qizilbash stormed into the harem, where the queen resided, and strangled Khayr al-Nisa Begum. Although Abbas was still only a boy and barely knew his mother, her murder at the hands of the Qizilbash made a deep impression on him. From that time, he probably begun this belief that the power of the Qizilbash had to be broken.

Ascension 
After the queen's death, Hamza Mirza, aged eleven, was proclaimed crown prince. The Qizilbash found no reason to fear a child and so, assumed ultimate power over the disturbed state of the realm and fought among themselves to gain more. The conflict was most intense at the court in Qazvin and in Khorasan, where Ali-Qoli Khan Shamlu, and his principal ally, Murshid Qoli Khan Ustajlu, had for some time been at war with the Turkman governor of Mashhad, Morteza Quli Khan Pornak. The Takkalu tribe eventually seized the power in Qazvin and proceeded to purge a number of prominent Shamlu members, among them being mother and father of Ali-Qoli Khan. This angered Ali-Qoli Khan and, just as the queen had predicted, in 1581, he took arms against the crown and made his ward, the ten-years-old Abbas, the figurehead of a rebellion in Khorasan by proclaiming him Shah of Iran. Ali-Qoli and Murshid Qoli Khan took control of Nishapur; there, they struck coins and read khutba in Abbas' name.

In the following year, an army from Western Iran advanced into Khorasan to resolve the situation. This army laid siege on Torbat-e Heydarieh, where Murshid Qoli held control, and on Herat, where both Ali-Qoli Khan and Abbas resided. Both attempts proved futile. Upon hearing the news of another Ottoman attack on the northwest Iran, the leading ministers of the campaign hurriedly reached an agreement with Ali-Qoli Khan. The former rebel paid no repercussions and only had to pledge loyalty to Hamza Mirza as the heir apparent. He remained as the governor and as Abbas' guardian and even received a reward from the shah. Mohammad Khodabanda removed Ali-Qoli Khan's old enemy, Morteza Quli Khan Pornak, from his position as governor of Mashhad and replace him with an Ustajlu amir. According to Iskandar Beg Monshi, many came to believe Abbas Mirza's claim would eventually prevail Hamza Mirza.

Meanwhile, Hamza Mirza was preoccupied with pushing Ottomans out of Tabriz. However, he caught up in the rivalries between the Qizilbash tribes and angered his officers by executing the Qizilbash governor of Azarbaijan. Thus, in 5 December 1586, he was assassinated by his personal barber, who may have had been in bribed by a group of Qizilbash conspirators. This assassination carved the way for Abbas' ascension.

In the meantime, in Khorasan, Murshid Qoli Khan emerged as a rival to Ali-Qoli. He successfully seized Mashhad and abducted Abbas from Ali-Qoli's possession. An Uzbek invasion advanced through Khorasan and laid siege on Herat. This threatened Murshid Qoli's position who realised it was his last chance to enthrone Abbas. Many of the Qizilbash amirs gave assurance of their support for placing Abbas on the throne, and after learning that Mohammad Khodabanda had left Qazvin to confront rebels in the south, Murshid Qoli Khan decided to strike. Thus, on the first ten days of Ramadan 1586, Abbas and his guardian and a small escort, not more than a few hundred horsemen, decided to ride towards Qazvin. As they rode through the Silk Road, Qizilbash amirs from the powerful Takkalu, Afshar and Zul al-Qadr tribes, who controlled many of the key towns on the way, came to pledge their allegiance. By the time they approached Qazvin, their small force had increased to 2,000 armed horsemen. The lord mayor of Qazvin and the Qizilbash amirs inside the city at first urged resistance. But they gave up when crowds of citizens and soldiers,  anxious to avoid fighting, came out onto the streets and voiced their support for Abbas, who rode into the capital beside Murshid Qoli Khan on a late September day in 1587.

Mohammad Khodabanda and his heir apparent, Abu Taleb Mirza, and their entourage of Ustajlu and Shamlu amirs, were camped in 200 miles away in the city of Qom. When the news reached them, the amirs decided to abandon the shah and his heir for Abbas Mirza. Mohammad Khodabanda found no choice but to abdicate. On 1 October 1588, at a ceremony in the palace in Qazvin, he placed his crown on the head of his seventeen-year-old son, who ascended the throne as Abbas I. Murshid Qoli Khan, to whom Abbas owed the crown, was rewarded with the title of vakil (viceroy).

Absolute monarch

Abbas takes control

The kingdom Abbas inherited was in a desperate state. The Ottomans had seized vast territories in the west and the north-west (including the major city of Tabriz) and the Uzbeks had overrun half of Khorasan in the north-east. Iran itself was riven by fighting between the various factions of the Qizilbash, who had mocked royal authority by killing the queen in 1579 and the grand vizier Mirza Salman Jabiri in 1583.

First, Abbas settled his score with his mother's killers, executing three of the ringleaders of the plot and exiling four others. His next task was to free himself from the power of Murshid Qoli Khan. Murshid made Abbas marry Hamza's widow and a Safavid cousin, and began distributing important government posts among his own friends, gradually confining Abbas to the palace. Meanwhile, the Uzbeks continued their conquest of Khorasan. When Abbas heard they were besieging his old friend Ali Qoli Khan Shamlu in Herat, he pleaded with Murshid to take action. Fearing a rival, Murshid did nothing until the news came that Herat had fallen and the Uzbeks had slaughtered the entire population. Only then did he set out on campaign to Khorasan. But Abbas planned to avenge the death of Ali Qoli Khan, and he arranged for four Qizilbash leaders to kill Murshid after a banquet on 23 July 1589. With Murshid gone, Abbas could now rule Iran in his own right.

Abbas decided he must re-establish order within Iran before he took on the foreign invaders. To this end he made a humiliating peace treaty – known as the Treaty of Istanbul – with the Ottomans in 1590, ceding to them the provinces of Azerbaijan, Karabagh, Ganja, Dagestan, and Qarajadagh, as well as parts of Georgia, Luristan and Kurdistan. This demeaning treaty even ceded the previous capital of Tabriz to the Ottomans.

Reducing Qizilbash's power and Caucasus invasions

The Qizilbash had provided the backbone of the Safavid army from the very beginning of Safavid rule and they also occupied many posts in the government. As a result, effective power in the state in the early days of the dynasty was held by the Qizilbash, leaving the shah often powerless. To counterbalance their power and as a decisive answer to this problem, Abbas turned to the newly introduced members of Iranian society (an initiative put in place by Shah Tahmasp I) the ghulams (a word literally meaning "slaves"). From these newly introduced slaves, the Shah created a gunpowder force, reaching numbers up to 37,000 soldiers, completely funded by the Crown. This weakened the power that the Qizilbash had against the crown significantly as they no longer had a "military monopoly" in Persia. Like the janissaries of the neighbouring Ottoman Empire, these ghulams were mainly Georgians, Circassians and Armenians who had been brought into Iran en masse (by conquest and slave trade), had converted or had been converted to Islam, and had taken up service in the army, royal household or the civil administration, and were loyal only to the shah. Under Abbas' leadership this new grouping in Iranian society (also called the third force) grew in influence and power, with many thousands of ethnic Georgians, Circassians and Armenians becoming an integral part of Iranian society and taking up key government, royal household and military positions.

Tahmasp I, the second Safavid shah, had realised, by looking at his own empire and that of the neighbouring Ottomans, that he faced ongoing threats from dangerous rival factions and internal family rivalries that were a threat to him as the head of state. If not properly managed, these rivalries represented a serious threat to the ruler or could lead to unnecessary court intrigues. For Tahmasp, the problem revolved around the military tribal elite of the empire, the Qizilbash, who believed that physical proximity to and control of a member of the immediate Safavid family guaranteed spiritual advantages, political fortune and material advancement.

Therefore, between 1540 and 1555, Tahmasp conducted a series of invasions of the Caucasus region which provided battle experience for his soldiers, as well as leading to the capture of large numbers of Christian Circassian and Georgian slaves (30,000 just in these four raids). These slaves would form the basis of an Safavid military slave system. These slaves would serve a similar role in their formation, implementation and use to the janissaries of the neighbouring Ottoman Empire. Their arrival in such large numbers led to the formation of a new grouping in Iranian society solely composed of ethnic Caucasians. Although the first slave soldiers would not be organized until Abbas' reign, during Tahmasp's time Caucasians would already become important members of the royal household, the harem and in the civil and military administration.

Learning from his grandfather, Abbas (who had been used by the vying Qizilbash factions during his youth) decided to encourage this new (Caucasian) grouping in Iranian society, as he realized that he must impose his authority on the Qezelbāš or remain their tool. So Abbas single-handedly encouraged the growth in influence and power of this new grouping, also called the third force. It is estimated that during Abbas' reign alone some 130,000 to 200,000 Georgians, tens of thousands of Circassians, and around 300,000 Armenians were deported from the Caucasus to Persia's heartland, with a significant number gaining responsibilities and roles in Iranian society, including some of the highest positions of the state, including the ghulam corps. Many of those deported from the Caucasus settled in various regions of Iran and became craftsmen, farmers, cattle breeders, traders, soldiers, generals, governors and peasants within Iranian society.
As part of the ghulam slave system, Abbas greatly expanded the ghulam military corps (also known as ḡolāmān-e ḵāṣṣa-ye-e šarifa, tr. as "crown servants") from just a few hundred during Tahmasp's era, to 15,000 highly trained cavalrymen, as part of a whole army division of 40,000 Caucasian ghulams. Abbas then reduced the number of Qizilbash provincial governorships and systematically moved Qizilbash governors to other districts, thus disrupting their ties with the local community and reducing their power. Most were eventually replaced by ghulams, whose loyalty was to the shah.

By 1595, Allahverdi Khan, a Georgian, had become one of the most powerful men in the Safavid state  when he was appointed the Governor-General of Fars, one of the richest provinces in Persia. His power reached its peak in 1598, when he became the commander-in-chief of all the armed forces. Not only did the ghulam system allowed the shah to control and manage the rival Qizilbash Turks and Persians, it also resolved budgetary problems, in the short term at least, as by restoring the Shah's complete control of the provinces formerly governed by the Qizilbash chiefs, the provinces' revenues now supplemented the royal treasury. From now on, government officials collected the taxes and remitted them directly to the royal treasury. In the harem, the Circassians and Georgians rapidly replaced the Turcoman factions and, as a result, gained a significant direct influence on the meritocratic Safavid bureaucracy and the court of the Safavid state.

The increasing numbers of Georgians and Circassians in the Safavid bureaucracy and the court of the Safavid state vied with the Qizilbash for power and as a result also became involved in court intrigues. This competition for influence saw queens (and their supporters in the harem, court and bureaucracy) compete against each other in order to get their own sons on the throne. This competition increased under Abbas and his successors which weakened the dynasty considerably. Abbas' own son and crown prince, Mohammad Baqer Mirza, was caught in the court intrigue involving several leading Circassians, which eventually led to him being executed under Abbas' orders.

Though the ghulam system did not work as well as it had after the Safavids, the third force would continue to play a crucial role during the rest of the Safavid era and later until the fall of the Qajar dynasty.

Reforming the army
Abbas needed ten years to get his army into shape so that he could effectively confront his Ottoman and Uzbek enemies. During this period, the Uzbeks and the Ottomans took swaths of territory from Iran. He also used military reorganisation as another way of side-lining the Qizilbash. He created a standing army of many thousands of ghulams (always conscripted from ethnic Georgians and Circassians), and to a much lesser extent Iranians, to fight alongside the traditional, feudal force provided by the Qizilbash. The new army regiments' loyalty was to the Shah. The new army consisted of 10,000 to 15,000 cavalry or squires (conscripted Caucasian ghulams) armed with muskets and other weapons (then the largest cavalry in the world), a corps of musketeers, or tufangchiyan, (12,000 strong) and a corp of artillery, called tupchiyan (also 12,000 strong). In addition Abbas had a personal bodyguard, composed of Caucasian ghulams, that was increased to 3,000. This force amounted to about 40,000 soldiers paid for and beholden to the Shah.

Abbas greatly increased the number of cannon at his disposal so that he could field 500 cannon in a single battle. Ruthless discipline was enforced and looting was severely punished. Abbas was also able to draw on military advice from a number of European envoys, particularly the English adventurers Sir Anthony Shirley and his brother Robert Shirley, who arrived in 1598 as envoys from the Earl of Essex on an unofficial mission to persuade Persia to enter into an anti-Ottoman alliance.

From 1600 onwards, the Safavid statesman Allāhverdī Khan, in conjunction with Robert Shirley, undertook further reorganizations of the army, which led to a further increase in the number of ghulams to 25,000.

Consolidation of the Empire
During the 1590s, Abbas moved to depose the provincial rulers of Persia. He started with Khan Ahmad Khan, the ruler of Gilan, who had disobeyed Abbas' orders when he requested that Khan Ahmad Khan's daughter Yakhan Begum marry Abbas' son, Mohammad Baqer Mirza, since Khan Ahmad Khan had no male successor. Khan Ahmad Khan disagreed due to the age of his daughter. This resulted in a Safavid invasion of Gilan in 1591 under the leadership of one of Abbas' favourites, Farhad Khan Qaramanlu. In 1593–94, Jahangir III, the Paduspanid ruler of Nur, travelled to the court of the Abbas, where he handed over his domains to him, and spend the rest of his life on an estate at Saveh, which Abbas had given to him. In 1597, Abbas deposed the Khorshidi ruler of Lar. One year later, Jahangir IV, the Paduspanid ruler of Kojur, killed two prominent Safavid nobles during a festival in Qazvin. In response, in 1598 Abbas invaded his domains and besieged Kojur. Jahangir managed to flee, but was captured and killed by a pro-Safavid Paduspanid named Hasan Lavasani.

Reconquest

War against the Uzbeks
Abbas' first campaign with his reformed army was against the Uzbeks who had seized Khorasan and were ravaging the province. In April 1598 he went on the attack. One of the two main cities of the province, Mashhad, was easily recaptured but the Uzbek leader Din Mohammed Khan was safely behind the walls of the other chief city, Herat. Abbas managed to lure the Uzbek army out of the town by feigning a retreat. A bloody battle ensued on 9 August 1598, in the course of which the Uzbek khan was wounded and his troops retreated (the khan was murdered by his own men during the retreat). However, during the battle, Farhad Khan had fled after being wounded and was later accused of fleeing due to cowardice. He was nevertheless forgiven by Abbas, who wanted to appoint him as the governor of Herat, which Farhad Khan refused. According to Oruch Beg, Farhad Khan's refusal made Abbas feel that he had been insulted. Due to Farhad Khan's arrogant behaviour and his suspected treason, he was seen as a threat to Abbas, so Abbas had him executed. Abbas then converted Gilan and Mazandaran into the crown domain (khasseh), and appointed Allahverdi Khan as the new commander-in-chief of the Safavid army.

By 1599, Abbas had conquered not only Herat and Mashhad, but had moved as far east as Balkh. This would be a short-lived victory and he would eventually have to settle on controlling only some of this conquest after the new ruler of the Khanate of Khiva, Baqi Muhammad Khan attempted to retake Balkh and Abbas found his troops were still no match for the Uzbeks. By 1603, the battle lines had stabilized, albeit with the loss of the majority of the Persian artillery. Abbas was able to hold onto most of Khorassan, including Herat, Sabzevar, Farah, and Nisa.

Abbas' north-east frontier was now safe for the time being and he could turn his attention to the Ottomans in the west. After defeating the Uzbeks, he moved his capital from Qazvin to Isfahan.

War against the Ottomans

The Safavids had not yet beaten their archrival, the Ottomans, in battle. After a particularly arrogant series of demands from the Ottoman ambassador, the Shah had him seized, had his beard shaved and sent it to his master, the sultan, in Constantinople. This was effectively a declaration of war. In the resulting conflict, Abbas first recaptured Nahavand and destroyed the fortress in the city, which the Ottomans had planned to use as an advance base for attacks on Iran. The next year, Abbas pretended he was setting off on a hunting expedition to Mazandaran with his men. This was merely a ruse to deceive the Ottoman spies in his court – his real target was Azerbaijan. He changed course for Qazvin where he assembled a large army and set off to retake Tabriz, which had been in Ottoman hands for some time.

For the first time, the Iranians made great use of their artillery and the town – which had been ruined by Ottoman occupation – soon fell. Abbas set off to besiege Yerevan, a town that had become one of the main Ottoman strongholds in the Caucasus since the Safavids had ceded it in 1590. It finally fell in June 1604 and with it the Ottomans lost the support of most Armenians, Georgians and other Caucasians. But Abbas was unsure how the new Sultan Ahmed I, would respond and withdrew from the region using scorched earth tactics. For a year, neither side made a move, but in 1605, Abbas sent his general Allahverdi Khan to meet Ottoman forces on the shores of Lake Van. On 6 November 1605 the Iranians, led by Abbas, scored a decisive victory over the Ottomans at Sufiyan, near Tabriz. In the Caucasus, during the war Abbas also managed to capture what is now Kabardino-Balkaria. The Persian victory was recognised in the Treaty of Nasuh Pasha in 1612, effectively granting them back suzerainty over most of the Caucasus.

Several years of peace followed as the Ottomans carefully planned their response. But their secret training manoeuvres were observed by Iranian spies. Abbas learnt that the Ottoman plan was to invade Iran via Azerbaijan, take Tabriz then move on to Ardabil and Qazvin, which they could use as bargaining chips in exchange for other territories. The shah decided to lay a trap. He would allow the Ottomans to enter the country, then destroy them. He had Tabriz evacuated of its inhabitants while he waited at Ardabil with his army. In 1618, an Ottoman army of 100,000 led by the Grand Vizier Damat Halil Pasha invaded and easily seized Tabriz. The vizier sent an ambassador to the shah demanding he make peace and return the lands taken since 1602. Abbas refused and pretended he was ready to set fire to Ardabil and retreat further inland rather than face the Ottoman army. When Halil Pasha heard the news, he decided to march on Ardabil right away. This was just what Abbas wanted. His army of 40,000 was hiding at a crossroads on the way and they ambushed the Ottoman army in a battle, which ended in complete victory for the Iranians.

In 1623, Abbas decided to take back Mesopotamia, which had been lost by his grandfather Tahmasp through the Ottoman-Safavid War (1532–1555). Profiting from the confusion surrounding the accession of the new Ottoman Sultan Murad IV, he pretended to be making a pilgrimage to the Shi'ite shrines of Kerbala and Najaf, but used his army to seize Baghdad. However, Abbas was then distracted by a rebellion in Georgia in 1624 led by Giorgi Saakadze thus allowing an Ottoman force to besiege Baghdad, but the Shah came to its relief the next year and crushed the Turkish army decisively. In 1638, however, after Abbas' death, the Ottomans retook Baghdad, and the Iranian–Ottoman border was finalised to be roughly the same as the current Iran–Turkey and Iran–Iraq borders.

Quelling the Georgian uprisings

Between 1614 and 1616, during the Ottoman-Safavid War, Abbas suppressed a rebellion led by his formerly loyal Georgian subjects Luarsab II and Teimuraz I (also known as Tahmuras Khan) in the Kingdom of Kakheti.

In 1606, Abbas had appointed these Georgians onto the thrones of Safavid vassals Kartli and Kakheti, at the behest of Kartlian nobles and Teimuraz's mother Ketevan; both seemed like malleable youths. However, tensions soon arose between the Shah and the Georgian kings. In 1613, when the Shah summoned them to join him on a hunting expedition in Mazandaran, they did not appear as they feared that they would be either imprisoned or killed. At this point war broke out, Iranian armies invaded the two territories in March 1614, and the two allied kings subsequently sought refuge in the Ottoman vassal Imeretia. Abbas, as reported by the Safavid court historian Iskander Beg Munshi, was infuriated by what was perceived as the defection of two of his most trusted subjects and gholams. He deported 30,000 Kakhetian peasants to Iran, and appointed a grandson of Alexander II of Imereti to the throne of Kartli, Jesse of Kakheti (also known as "Isā Khān"). Raised up at the court in Isfahan and a Muslim, he was perceived as fully loyal to the Shah.

Abbas threatened Imeretia with devastation if they did not give up the fugitive kings; the Imeretian, Mingrelian and Gurian rulers jointly refused his demand. Luarsab, however, surrendered voluntarily to the Shah; Abbas initially treated him well but when he learned that Luarsab and Teimuraz had offered an alliance with the Ottomans he demanded that Luarsab accept Islam. When Luarsab refused, he was thrown in prison.

Teimuraz returned to eastern Georgia in 1615, taking advantage of a resurgence in Ottoman-Safavid hostilities, and there he defeated a Safavid force. However, when the Ottoman army postponed its invasion of the Safavids, Abbas was able to briefly send an army back to defeat Teimuraz, and redoubled his invasion after brokering a truce with the Ottomans. Now Iranian rule was fully restored over eastern Georgia. Subsequently, the Shah marched on Kutaisi, the capital of Imereti, and punished its peoples for harbouring the defectors. In a punitive expedition to Kakhetia, his army then killed perhaps 60–70,000 or 100,000 Georgians, with twice as many more being deported to Iran, removing about two-thirds of the Kakhetian population. More refugees were rounded up in 1617. In 1619 Abbas appointed the loyal Simon II (or Semayun Khan) as a puppet ruler of Kakheti, while placing a series of his own governors to rule over districts where the rebellious inhabitants were mostly located.

Having momentarily secured the region, Abbas took further acts of revenge for the recalcitrance of Teimuraz and Luarsab. He castrated Teimuraz's sons, who both died shortly afterwards. He executed Luarsab in 1622, and in 1624 he had Ketevan, who had been sent to the Shah as a negotiator, tortured to death when she refused to renounce Christianity. Teimuraz, meanwhile, sought aid from the Ottomans and Russia.

Abbas was then warned of another imminent Kakhetian uprising, so he returned to Georgia in early 1625. He lured Kakhetian soldiers on a false pretext and then began executing them. He also had plans to execute all armed Kartlians, including his own general Giorgi Saakadze; however Saakadze intercepted a courier and uncovered the plot. Saakadze then defected to the Georgians, and led a new rebellion which succeeded in throwing the Persians out of Kartli and Kakheti while crowning Teimuraz as king of both territories. Abbas counterattacked in June, won the subsequent war and dethroned Teimuraz, but lost half his army at the hands of the Georgians and was forced to accept Kartli and Kakheti only as vassal states while abandoning his plans to eliminate Christians from the area.

Even then, Saakadze and Teimuraz launched another rebellion in 1626, and were effective in clearing Iranian forces from most of the region. Thus, the Georgian territories continued to resist Safavid encroachments until Abbas' death.

Kandahar and the Mughals

The Safavids were traditionally allied with the Mughals in India against the Uzbeks, who coveted the province of Khorasan. The Mughal emperor Humayun had given Abbas' grandfather, Shah Tahmasp, the province of Kandahar as a reward for helping him regain his throne. In 1590, profiting from the confusion in Iran, Humayun's successor Akbar seized Kandahar. Abbas continued to maintain cordial relations with the Mughals, even though he pursued the return of Kandahar. Finally, in 1620, a diplomatic incident, in which the Iranian ambassador refused to bow down in front of the Emperor Jahangir, led to war. India was embroiled in civil turmoil and Abbas realized that he needed just a lightning raid to take back the far easternmost town of Kandahar in 1622.

After the conquest, he was very conciliatory to Jahangir, claiming he had only taken back what was rightly his and disavowing any further territorial ambitions. Jahangir was not appeased but he was unable to recapture the province. A childhood friend of Abbas, named Ganj Ali Khan, was then appointed as the governor of the city, which he would govern until his death in 1624/5.

War against the Portuguese

During the 16th century, the Portuguese had established bases in the Persian Gulf. In 1602, the Iranian army under the command of Imam-Quli Khan Undiladze managed to expel the Portuguese from Bahrain. In 1622, with the help of four English ships, Abbas retook Hormuz from the Portuguese. He replaced it as a trading centre with a new port, Bandar Abbas, nearby on the mainland, but it never became successful.

Shah and his subjects

Isfahan: a new capital
Abbas moved his capital from Qazvin to the more central city of Isfahan in 1598. Embellished by a magnificent series of new mosques, baths, colleges, and caravansarais, Isfahan became one of the most beautiful cities in the world. As Roger Savory writes, "Not since the development of Baghdad in the eighth century A.D. by the Caliph al-Mansur had there been such a comprehensive example of town-planning in the Islamic world, and the scope and layout of the city centre clearly reflect its status as the capital of an empire." Isfahan became the centre of Safavid architectural achievement, with the mosques Masjed-e Shah and the Masjed-e Sheykh Lotfollah and other monuments including the Ali Qapu, the Chehel Sotoun palace and the Naghsh-i Jahan Square.

In making Isfahan the centre of Safavid Empire, Abbas utilized the Armenian people, whom he had forcibly relocated to Isfahan from their Armenian homelands. Once they were settled, he allowed them considerable freedom and encouraged them to continue in their silk trade. Silk was an integral part of the economy and considered to be the best form of hard currency available. The Armenians had already established trade networks that allowed Abbas to strengthen Iran's economy.

Arts

Abbas' painting studios (of the Isfahan school established under his patronage) created some of the finest art in modern Iranian history, by such illustrious painters as Reza Abbasi and Muhammad Qasim. Despite the ascetic roots of the Ṣafavid dynasty and the religious injunctions restricting the pleasures lawful to the faithful, the art of Abbas' time denoted a certain relaxation of the strictures. The portrait by Muhammad Qasim suggests that the Muslim prohibition against the consumption of wine, as well as that against male intimacy, "were more honoured in the breach than in the observance". Abbas brought in 300 Chinese potters to Iran to enhance local production of Chinese-style ceramics.

Under Abbas' reign, carpet weaving increased its role as an important part of Persian industry and culture, as wealthy Europeans started importing Persian rugs. Silk production became a monopoly of the crown, and manuscripts, bookbinding, and ceramics were also important exports.

Attitude towards religious minorities
Like almost all other Safavid monarchs, Abbas was a Shi'ite Muslim. He had a particular veneration for Imam Hussein. In 1601, he made a pilgrimage on foot from Isfahan to Mashhad, site of the shrine of Imam Reza, which he restored (it had been despoiled by the Uzbeks). Since Sunni Islam was the religion of Iran's main rival, the Ottoman Empire, Abbas often treated Sunnis living in western border provinces harshly.

Abbas was usually tolerant of Christianity. The Italian traveller Pietro della Valle was astonished at the Shah's knowledge of Christian history and theology and establishing diplomatic links with European Christian states was a vital part of the shah's foreign policy. Christian Armenia was a key Safavid province bordering the Ottoman Empire. From 1604 Abbas implemented a "scorched earth" policy in the region to protect his north-western frontier against any invading Ottoman forces, a policy that involved the forced resettlement of up to 300,000 Armenians from their homelands. The Armenians came primarily from the wealthy Armenian merchant town of Jugha (also known as Jolfa). Many were transferred to New Julfa, a town the shah had built for the Armenians primarily meant for these Armenians from Jugha ("Old Julfa"), near his capital Isfahan. Thousands of Armenians died on the journey. Those who survived enjoyed considerable religious freedom in New Julfa, where the shah built them a new cathedral. Abbas' aim was to boost the Iranian economy by encouraging the Armenian merchants who had moved to New Julfa. As well as religious liberties, he also offered them interest-free loans and allowed the town to elect its own mayor (kalantar). Other Armenians were transferred to the provinces of Gilan and Mazandaran. These were less lucky. Abbas wanted to establish a second capital in Mazandaran, Farahabad, but the climate was unhealthy and malarial. Many settlers died and others gradually abandoned the city.

Abbas was more intolerant of Christians in Georgia, where the threat of rebellion loomed larger. Abbas frequently demanded that nobles convert to Shia Islam, and had Ketevan the Martyr tortured to death when she refused. Abbas's anger at Georgian rebelliousness also generated his plan to deport or exterminate eastern Georgia's Christians and replace them with Turkmens, which has been described as "genocidal".

Contacts with Europe

Abbas' tolerance towards most Christians was part of his policy of establishing diplomatic links with European powers to try to enlist their help in the fight against their common enemy, the Ottoman Empire. The idea of such an anti-Ottoman alliance was not a new one – over a century before, Uzun Hassan, then ruler of part of Iran, had asked the Venetians for military aid – but none of the Safavids had made diplomatic overtures to Europe and Abbas' attitude was in marked contrast to that of his grandfather, Tahmasp I, who had expelled the English traveller Anthony Jenkinson from his court upon hearing he was a Christian. For his part, Abbas declared that he "preferred the dust from the shoe soles of the lowest Christian to the highest Ottoman personage".

In 1599, Abbas sent his first diplomatic mission to Europe. The group crossed the Caspian Sea and spent the winter in Moscow, before proceeding through Norway, Germany (where it was received by Emperor Rudolf II) to Rome where Pope Clement VIII gave the travellers a long audience. They finally arrived at the court of Philip III of Spain in 1602. Although the expedition never managed to return to Iran, being shipwrecked on the journey around Africa, it marked an important new step in contacts between Iran and Europe and Europeans began to be fascinated by the Iranians and their culture – Shakespeare's 1601–02 Twelfth Night, for example, makes two references (at II.5 and III.4) to 'the Sophy', then the English term for the Shahs of Iran. Persian fashions—such as shoes with heels, for men—were enthusiastically adopted by European aristocrats. Henceforward, the number of diplomatic missions to and fro greatly increased.

The shah had set great store on an alliance with Spain, the chief opponent of the Ottomans in Europe. Abbas offered trading rights and the chance to preach Christianity in Iran in return for help against the Ottomans. But the stumbling block of Hormuz remained, a port that had fallen into Spanish hands when the King of Spain inherited the throne of Portugal in 1580. The Spanish demanded Abbas break off relations with the English East India Company before they would consider relinquishing the town. Abbas was unable to comply. Eventually Abbas became frustrated with Spain, as he did with the Holy Roman Empire, which wanted him to make his 400,000+ Armenian subjects swear allegiance to the Pope but did not trouble to inform the shah when the Emperor Rudolf signed a peace treaty with the Ottomans. Contacts with the Pope, Poland and Muscovy were no more fruitful.

More came of Abbas' contacts with the English, although England had little interest in fighting against the Ottomans. The Shirley brothers arrived in 1598 and helped reorganise the Iranian army, which proved to be pivotal for the Safavid victory in the Ottoman-Safavid War (1603–1618) and the first Safavid victory in battle over their neighbouring Ottoman archrivals. One of the Shirley brothers, Robert Shirley, led Abbas' second diplomatic mission to Europe between 1609 and 1615. The English East India Company also began to take an interest in Iran and in 1622 four of its ships helped Abbas retake Hormuz from the Portuguese. The capture of Ormuz gave the opportunity for the Company to develop trade with Persia, attempting to trade English cloth and other commodities for silk, with did not become very profitable due to the lack of Persian interest and small quantity of English goods.

Family tragedies and death

Of Abbas' five sons, three had survived past childhood, so the Safavid succession seemed secure. He was on good terms with the crown prince, Mohammed Baqir Mirza (born 1587; better known in the West as Safi Mirza). In 1614, however, during a campaign in Georgia, the shah heard rumours that the prince was conspiring against him with a leading Circassian, Farhad Beg Cherkes. Shortly after, Mohammed Baqir broke protocol during a hunt by killing a boar before the shah had a chance to put his spear in the animal. This seemed to confirm Abbas' suspicions and he sunk into melancholy; he no longer trusted any of his three sons. In 1615, he decided he had no choice but to have Mohammed killed. A Circassian named Behbud Beg executed the Shah's orders and the prince was murdered in a hammam in the city of Resht. The shah almost immediately regretted his action and was plunged into grief.

In 1621, Abbas fell seriously ill. His heir, Mohammed Khodabanda, thought he was on his deathbed and began to celebrate his accession to the throne with his Qizilbash supporters. But the shah recovered and punished his son by blinding him, which would disqualify him from ever taking the throne. The blinding was only partially successful and the prince's followers planned to smuggle him out of the country to safety with the Mughals whose aid they would use to overthrow Abbas and install Mohammed on the throne. But the plot was betrayed, the prince's followers were executed and the prince himself imprisoned in the fortress of Alamut where he would later be murdered by Abbas' successor, Shah Safi.

Imam Qoli Mirza, the third and last son, then became the crown prince. Abbas groomed him carefully for the throne but, for some reason, in 1627, he had him partially blinded and imprisoned in Alamut.

Unexpectedly, Abbas now chose as heir the son of Mohammed Baqir Mirza, Sam Mirza, a cruel and introverted character who was said to loathe his grandfather because of his father's murder. Nevertheless, he did succeed Shah Abbas at the age of 17 in 1629, taking the name Shah Safi. Abbas's health was poor from 1621 onwards. He died at his palace in Farahabad on the Caspian coast in 1629 and was buried in Kashan.

Character and legacy

According to Roger Savory: "Shah Abbas I possessed in abundance qualities which entitle him to be styled 'the Great'. He was a brilliant strategist and tactician whose chief characteristic was prudence. He preferred to obtain his ends by diplomacy rather than war, and showed immense patience in pursuing his objectives." In Michael Axworthy's view, Abbas "was a talented administrator and military leader, and a ruthless autocrat. His reign was the outstanding creative period of the Safavid era. But the civil wars and troubles of his childhood (when many of his relatives were murdered) left him with a dark twist of suspicion and brutality at the centre of his personality." Donald Rayfield described him as "exceptionally perspicacious and active," but also "a murderous paranoiac when aroused."

The Cambridge History of Iran rejects the view that the death of Abbas marked the beginning of the decline of the Safavid dynasty as Iran continued to prosper throughout the 17th century, but blames him for the poor statesmanship of the later Safavid shahs: "The elimination of royal princes, whether by blinding or immuring them in the harem, their exclusion from the affairs of state and from contact with the leading aristocracy of the empire and the generals, all the abuses of the princes' education, which were nothing new but which became the normal practice with Abbas at the court of Isfahan, effectively put a stop to the training of competent successors, that is to say, efficient princes prepared to meet the demands of ruling as kings."

Abbas was fluent in the Turkic dialect used by the Turkoman portion of the multi-ethnic Qizilbash organization, although he was equally at ease speaking Persian, which was the language of the administration and culture, of the majority of the population, as well as of the court when Isfahan became the capital under his reign (1598). According to García de Silva Figueroa, the Spanish ambassador to the Safavid court during Abbas' later reign, he heard Abbas speak Georgian, which he had doubtlessly acquired from his Georgian gholams and concubines.

Abbas gained strong support from the common people. Sources report him spending much of his time among them, personally visiting bazaars and other public places in Isfahan. Short in stature but physically strong until his health declined in his final years, Abbas could go for long periods without needing to sleep or eat and could ride great distances. At the age of 19, Abbas shaved off his beard, keeping only his moustache, thus setting a fashion in Iran.

Abbas was also an charismatic orator who could persuade and influence people with his eloquence. Classic Turkmen poet Magtymguly, who lived a century after Abbas, mentioned him in the poem  (Not a jewel) with the following verses:

There are many who'd say they are good orators,
Though nobody is as eloquent as Shah Abbas.

Family
Consorts
A Circassian concubine, mother of Mohammad Baqer Mirza;
Fakhr Jahan Begum, daughter of King Bagrat VII of Kartli and Queen Anna of Kakheti, and mother of Zubayda Begum;
A daughter of Mustafa Mirza (m. 1587), daughter of Mustafa Mirza, son of Shah Tahmasp I;
Olghan Pasha Khanum (m. 1587), daughter of Husayn Mirza, son of Bahram Mirza Safavi, and widow of Hamza Mirza;
Yakhan Begum (m. 1 September 1602), daughter of Khan Ahmad Khan and Maryam Begum;
Princess Helena, daughter of King David I of Kakheti and Queen Ketevan the Martyr;
Fatima Sultan Begum also known a Peri and Lela, née Tinatin (married 1604 – div.), daughter of King George X of Kartli and Queen Mariam Lipartiani;
A sister of Ismail Khan, a Circassian, and Abbas' favourite wife;
A daughter of Shaykh Lotfullah Maisi, a Shia theologian;
Tamar Amilakhori, daughter of Faramarz Amilakhori and sister of Abd-ol-Ghaffar Amilakhori;

Sons
Mohammad Baqer Mirza (15 September 1587, Mashhad, Khorasan – killed 25 January 1615, Rasht, Gilan), was Governor of Mashhad 1587–1588, and of Hamadan 1591–1592. Married firstly at Esfahan, 1601, Princess Fakhr Jahan Begum, daughter of Ismail II, married secondly Dilaram Khanum, a Georgian. He had issue, two sons:
Sultan Abul-Naser Sam Mirza, succeeded as Safi – with Dilaram;
Sultan Suleiman Mirza (killed August 1632 at Alamut, Qazvin) – with Fakhr Jahan;
Sultan Hasan Mirza (September 1588, Mazandaran – 18 August 1591, Qazvin);
Soltan Mohammad Mirza (18 March 1591, Qazvin – killed August 1632, Alamut, Qazvin) Blinded on the orders of his father, 1621. Had issue, one daughter: 
Gawhar Shad Begum, married to Mirza Qazi, the Shaykh-ul-Islam of Isfahan;
Sultan Ismail Mirza (6 September 1601, Esfahan – killed 16 August 1613);
Imam Qoli Mirza (12 November 1602, Esfahan – killed August 1632, Alamut, Qazvin) Blinded on the orders of his father, 1627. He had issue, one son:
Najaf Qoli Mirza ( 1625 – killed August 1632, Alamut, Qazvin);

Daughters
Shahzada Begum, married to Mirza Mohsin Razavi. and had issue two sons;
Zubayda Begum (killed 20 February 1632), married to Isa Khan Shaykhavand, and had issue a daughter;
Jahan Banu Begum, married in 1624, Simon II of Kartli, son of Bagrat VII of Kartli by his wife, Queen Anna, daughter of Alexander II of Kakheti. She had issue, a daughter:
Princess Izz-i-Sharif Begum, married to Sayyid Abdullah, son of Mirza Muhammad Shafi. she had issue, a son:
Sayyid Muhammad Daud, married to Shahr Banu Begum, daughter of Suleiman I. She had issue, two sons including:
Suleiman II.
Agha Begum, married to Sultan al-Ulama Khalife Sultan, and had issue four sons and four daughters;
Havva Begum (died 1617, Zanjan), married firstly to Mirza Riza Shahristani (Sadr), married secondly to Mirza Rafi al-Din Muhammad (Sadr), and had issue three sons;
Shahr Banu Begum, married to Mir Abdulazim, darughah of Isfahan;
Malik Nissa Begum, married to Mir Jalal Shahristani, the mutvalli of the shrine of Imam Riza;

Ancestry

See also

 Battle of DimDim
 García de Silva Figueroa
 History of Iran
 Mausoleum of Shah Abbas I
 Persian embassy to Europe (1599–1602)
 Persian embassy to Europe (1609–1615)
 Safavid conversion of Iran from Sunnism to Shiism
 Shah Abbas Mosque, Yerevan
 Shah Abbas Mosque, Ganja

References

Notes

Citations

Bibliography

Further reading
 Yves Bomati and Houchang Nahavandi,Shah Abbas, Emperor of Persia,1587–1629, 2017, ed. Ketab Corporation, Los Angeles, English translation by Azizeh Azodi.
 Canby, Sheila R. (ed), 2009, Shah Abbas; The Remaking of Iran, 2009, British Museum Press,

External links

 Shah Abbās: The Remaking of Iran, The British Museum, in association with Iran Heritage Foundation, 19 February14 June 2009,
 John Wilson, Iranian treasures bound for Britain, BBC Radio 4, 19 January 2009, BBC Radio 4's live magazine, Front Row (audio report).
 "Shah 'Abbas: The Remaking of Iran"

Abbas 1
1571 births
1629 deaths
16th-century Iranian people
16th-century monarchs in the Middle East
17th-century Iranian people
17th-century monarchs of Persia
Filicides in Iran
Mazandarani people
Patrons of the arts
People from Herat